Eginton is a surname. Notable people with the surname include:

Francis Eginton (1737–1805), English glass painter
Francis Eginton (1775–1823), English engraver
Warren William Eginton (1924–2019), American judge